Al-Mawasit District is a district of the Taiz Governorate, Yemen. As of 2003, the district had a population of 115,857 inhabitants.

Location 

It is located in the southern part of Taiz governorate. It is bordered by Same'a and part of Al-Ma'afar to the north, Ash-Shamayatayn to the south, As Silw to the east and Ma'afar to the west.

Uzaal and villages of Al-Mawasit 
Rural districts in Yemen are divided into 'Uzaal while Uzaal are divided into villages. There are eighteen Uzaal in Al-Mawasit.
 Akhmur
 Al A'lum
 Al Ayfu'
 Bani Abas
 Bani Hamad
 Bani Yusuf
 Qadas

References

 
Districts of Taiz Governorate